Loligo reynaudii, commonly known as the Cape Hope squid, is a 20–30 cm long squid belonging to the family Loliginidae. In South Africa it is known as either calamari or chokka.

It was previously treated as a subspecies of Loligo vulgaris, the European squid.

Distribution
It occurs in coastal South African waters from False Bay to Port Elizabeth and as far as Port Alfred.

Description
This animal has an elongated slender body with eight short arms and two very long retractile tentacles, all of which have suckers. It has relatively long diamond-shaped fins, which run more than half the length of the mantle. Its eyes are covered with a membrane which is part of the skin covering the head.

Ecology
The South African squid is an important predator of small fishes. It forms dense breeding aggregations in bays between Cape Point and Port Elizabeth in summer, laying sausage-shaped bunches of egg bundles on the sea floor. The young are transported west by the Agulhas Current and mature on the Agulhas Bank. They then migrate eastwards as adults back to their spawning grounds.

The species is extensively exploited by commercial fisheries. Its natural predators include: Short-tail stingray, Diamond ray, Spotted ragged-tooth shark,  Cape fur seal, cat shark and numerous species of fish and birds.

References 

 Vecchione, M., E. Shea, S. Bussarawit, F. Anderson, D. Alexeyev, C.-C. Lu, T. Okutani, M. Roeleveld, C. Chotiyaputta, C. Roper, E. Jorgensen & N. Sukramongkol. (2005).  Phuket Marine Biological Center Research Bulletin 66: 23–26.

External links
Charles Maxwell videos

Squid
Cephalopods described in 1841